Crystal Barrier is an adventure for fantasy role-playing games published by Mayfair Games in 1987.

Plot summary
Crystal Barrier is a scenario for character levels 6-8, a sequel to a scenario in Mayfair's Dragons.  In order to aid the good side in a war between good and evil dragons, the heroes are sent to another world, where they must penetrate the fortress of the Necromancer to free the soul of the Dragon Lord.

In Crystal Barrier, the dragons of the Dragonlands are split by civil war, and the player characters are brought in to destroy a drug which could swing the balance of the war.  The party is flung into another dimension through the crystal barrier.

Publication history
Crystal Barrier was written by Cory Glaberson, with a cover by Boris Vallejo, and was published by Mayfair Games in 1987 as a 40-page book. The adventure module was part of the Role Aids line.

Reception
Graeme Davis reviewed Crystal Barrier for White Dwarf #90. He noted that "Crystal Barrier is written by Cory Glaberson, the author of Mayfair's Dragons supplement, and draws information from that work, although it is not dependent upon it. [...] The dragons are not the standard AD&D variety, but can still put up a respectable fight, and the party is well advised to co-operate, at least at first." He continued by stating that in the other dimension past the crystal barrier "there are some interesting effects and monsters around, as well as some hard fights if the random encounters go against the party.  60 Ghouls could give even a quite well-equipped 6th-8th level party a fair amount of trouble.  The main villain is a very nasty piece of work, and has a range of new spells and special powers which will appeal to hardware buffs once again.  The showdown in his castle is a standard dungeon bash, and so, really, is the whole adventure, but the special effects of this alternate dimension make it more interesting than the general run of hack and slay adventures.  It's quite heavy going, and I think it might give a party of up to 10th level a good run for their money.  There are powerful monsters, less powerful ones in great numbers [...] and a couple of whimsical touches that you will either love or loathe, like zombies wearing magical sunglasses which allow them to see through fog, and a gnoll with a pump-action shotgun.  There is a very interesting twist to the final encounter, too, which may lead to a dilemma for at least one member of the party." Davis concludes his review by saying, "If you're looking for an old-fashioned mid-level dungeon bash with some interesting twists, this one is for you."

References

Fantasy role-playing game adventures
Role Aids
Role-playing game supplements introduced in 1987